Tim Army (born April 26, 1963) is an American former professional ice hockey player who is currently serving as the head coach of the Iowa Wild of the American Hockey League (AHL). Army was selected by the Colorado Rockies in the 9th round (171st overall) of the 1981 NHL Entry Draft.

Army played four seasons at Providence College with the Providence Friars, where during the 1984–85 season he was rewarded for his outstanding play when he was named to the NCAA (East) First All-American Team and was selected as a finalist for the Hobey Baker Award.

He was inducted into the Rhode Island Hockey Hall of Fame in 2020.

Coaching career
Army played just two professional seasons before retiring due to injury. He returned to the Friars in serving as an assistant coach from 1988 to 1993, before accepting a NHL assistant coaching role with the Mighty Ducks of Anaheim from 1993 to 1997. After five seasons with the Washington Capitals as an assistant, Army secured his first head coach role with the Portland Pirates of the American Hockey League (AHL) in 2002.

In 2005, Army left the Pirates to take up the head coaching role with Providence College. Army directed the Friars program for six seasons before he returned to the NHL with the Colorado Avalanche as a video coach for the 2011–12 season. He was elevated to an assistant coach for the following season under Joe Sacco. He continued in an assistant coach role over the next five seasons under Sacco, Patrick Roy and Jared Bednar before his release from the club following the 2016–17 season.

Army then became an assistant coach for the Wilkes-Barre/Scranton Penguins, the AHL affiliate of the Pittsburgh Penguins in the 2017–18 season. After one season, he was hired as the head coach of the Iowa Wild, the AHL affiliate of the Minnesota Wild, for the 2018–19 season.

Army has served as an assistant coach for the United States men's national ice hockey team at the 1994 and 1996 Men's World Ice Hockey Championships, and at the 2004 World Cup of Hockey, and also the 2012 World Cup of Hockey

Head coaching record

College

Awards and honors

References

External links

1963 births
Living people
Anaheim Ducks coaches
Colorado Avalanche coaches
Colorado Rockies (NHL) draft picks
Ice hockey coaches from Rhode Island
Maine Mariners players
Providence Friars men's ice hockey players
Sportspeople from Providence, Rhode Island
Washington Capitals coaches
American men's ice hockey forwards
AHCA Division I men's ice hockey All-Americans
Ice hockey people from Providence, Rhode Island